Arocena is a surname. Notable people with the surname include:

Daymé Arocena (born 1992), Afro-Cuban jazz singer
Horacio Terra Arocena (1894–1985), Uruguayan architect and politician
Rodrigo Arocena (born 1947), Uruguayan mathematician and academic administrator